Carnival Panorama is a operated by Carnival Cruise Line. After Carnival finalized the ship's order with Italian shipbuilder Fincantieri in December 2016, the vessel had her keel laid in January 2018 and she was formally delivered in October 2019 as the last Vista-class vessel and the flagship of the fleet; she has served in the latter role until the Mardi Gras debuted in 2021. Since her debut in December 2019, she has been homeported at the Port of Long Beach and sails week-long itineraries to the Mexican Riviera.

Design and description
The vessel's public facilities are similar to and evolved from those offered on Carnival Vista and Carnival Horizon. One distinct feature is a Sky Zone trampoline park in place of the IMAX theater found on her older sister ships. The ship also has activity venues including a Waterworks aqua park inspired by Shaquille O'Neal.

Construction and career 
In March 2015, Carnival Corporation and Fincantieri made an agreement for five ships to be delivered between 2019 and 2022. On an announcement released on 30 December 2015, Carnival Corporation further established that the planned 4,200-passenger ship was set to be delivered to Carnival's sister brand, P&O Cruises Australia. A year later, on 15 December 2016, Carnival Corporation announced that the original order for P&O Cruises Australia would be transferred to Carnival Cruise Line as their third Vista-class vessel. The announcement stated that a delivery for the vessel was set for the fall of 2019. To compensate for the order, P&O was to receive a retrofitted  instead, however in September 2017, it was announced that Carnival Splendor would stay in the Carnival fleet and P&O Cruises Australia would get Princess Cruises  in 2020. On 1 December 2017, Carnival Corporation officially announced that the third and final ship in the Vista class of the fleet would be named Carnival Panorama.

Construction officially began on the then-unnamed vessel on 7 July 2017 at Fincantieri's shipyard in Marghera with a steel-cutting ceremony. The keel was laid on 10 January 2018. She was launched from the shipyard on 6 December 2018.

Carnival publicly previewed the ship in the 2019 Tournament of Roses Parade. The float, named "Come Sail Away," was modeled after the ship and contained trampolines and played upbeat music. On 18 July 2019, she completed her sea trials in the Adriatic Sea. On 29 October, Fincantieri officially presented Carnival Panorama to Carnival Cruise Line at the Marghera shipyard. To travel from Marghera to California for her christening and debut, Panorama embarked on a 38-day journey that took her across the Atlantic Ocean and through the Strait of Magellan to sail up the western coast of South America, making stops in Santa Cruz de Tenerife, Montevideo, Santiago, and Puerto Vallarta. She arrived at her initial destination of the Port of Los Angeles in the early morning of 8 December for final preparations.

On the afternoon of 9 December, Carnival Panorama moved to her home port, the Port of Long Beach, for her welcoming ceremonies and docked there for the first time early that evening. The ship was christened the following day by her godmother, Wheel of Fortune hostess Vanna White.

Since her debut, Carnival Panorama has been homeported in Long Beach. She embarked on her three-day inaugural voyage to Ensenada on 11 December 2019.

COVID-19 pandemic

When Carnival Panorama returned to Long Beach on 7 March 2020, a female passenger was reported to be ill. As a result, the debarkation was halted by the Centers for Disease Control and Prevention (CDC) and the Long Beach Fire Department until the woman could be tested for COVID-19 at a nearby hospital. Initial reports stated that the ailing guest did not meet the criteria for coronavirus, but the CDC wanted to take "extra precautions".

The CDC confirmed later in the evening that the guest tested negative for COVID-19, but the rest of the passengers spent the night onboard and disembarked the following morning. Due to the CDC holding Carnival Panorama one day late, her subsequent voyage was cut short to six days. The ship was returning from a trip to Mexico with scheduled stops at Cabo San Lucas, Mazatlán and Puerto Vallarta, which were also scheduled stops for Grand Princess during the previous month.

Carnival Panorama is the third Carnival ship (the others being the Australia-based Carnival Splendor and ) to transport crewmembers back to their respective countries.

Notes

References 

Panorama
Panamax cruise ships
Ships built by Fincantieri
Ships built in Venice